Hara  may refer to:
 an early name (Sanskrit: हर) of the deity Shiva, from the Harappan culture (Indus Valley Civilization)
 a name of the feminine aspect of God (Ishvara) known as Shakti (The feminine aspect has a long last a - Haraa and includes various feminine deities)